Pond House may refer to:
 A racehorse training facility made famous by trainer Martin Pipe
 A track on the St. Etienne album I've Been Trying to Tell You